The TCCB Open is a tournament for professional female tennis players played on outdoor clay courts. The event is classified as a $60,000 ITF Women's World Tennis Tour tournament and has been held in Collonge-Bellerive, Switzerland, since 2021.

Past finals

Singles

Doubles

External links 
 ITF search
 Official website

ITF Women's World Tennis Tour
Clay court tennis tournaments
Tennis tournaments in Switzerland
2021 establishments in Switzerland